Book of Souls: Folio A is the seventh studio album by Secret Chiefs 3, released on November 19, 2013 by Web of Mimicry.

Reception
The Louisville Eccentric Observer praised the colorful and emotionally stirring nature of the music and said "With Folio A, Secret Chiefs have given us another release that prides itself on intricately composed and eclectic songs delivered with an indifferently divisive attitude." Patrick W. Delaney of mxdwn Music was impressed by the band's artist growth, stating "those nine years spent crafting the music here feel as though they were well spent; even though the smorgasboard of sound that was Book of Horizons is unbelievably impressive, here the different elements feel a little more comfortable sitting next to each other." Music critic Christopher East pointed to the Book of Souls: Folio As cinematic quality as being its highlight but noted that the album did not match the success of the band's previous releases.

Track listing

Personnel
Adapted from the Book of Souls: Folio A liner notes.Secret Chiefs 3 Trey Spruance – production, engineering, mixing, illustrations, design, guitar (2-6, 8-13), bass guitar (1, 2, 4, 6, 8, 10-12), synthesizer (1-6, 8, 10, 12, 13), organ (2, 4, 6, 8, 10, 12), noises (2, 3, 4, 6, 8, 10, 12), sampler (2, 4, 6, 8), baritone guitar (3, 5), piano (1, 11), additional percussion (1, 11), bağlama (1), celesta (3), Hammond organ (3), recording (3), arrangements (5), dulcimer (9), Wurlitzer electric piano (9)Additional musicians Archie Carey – bassoon (2-4, 6, 8, 11, 12)
 Claire Chenette – oboe (1, 2, 4, 8, 10-12), English horn (2, 4, 8, 10, 11, 12)
 Elena Doroftei (as Anonymous 13) – viola and vocals (9)
 Toby Driver – bass guitar (13)
 Lori Goldston – cello (7)
 Adrián Terrazas-González – flute (2, 4, 8, 10, 11, 12)
 Kenny Grohowski – drums (2, 4, 12)
 Stephan Haluska – harp (2-4, 7, 8, 10-12)
 Timb Harris – viola (1-4, 7, 8, 10-12). violin (1-4, 7, 8, 10-13), cello (7)
 Danny Heifetz – left channel (1)
 Eyvind Kang – violin (1)
 Fatima Khanoam – santoor (1)
 KT Pierce – vocals (11)
 Shahzad Ismaily – bass guitar (3, 9), percussion (1)
 Steve Moore – trombone (3, 11), celesta (3)
 Dante Pascuzzo – contrabass (2, 4, 8, 10-12)
 Mike Patton – vocals (11), engineering (22)
 Jesse Quattro – vocals (3)
 Jason Schimmel – acoustic guitar (2-4, 6, 8, 10-12), vocals (2, 6, 10), vocals (4, 12), santoor (1), Wah Guitar (1), backing vocals (3), piano (11), engineering (1, 3, 7)
 Danny Shamoun – ney (1, 13)
 Mort Shuman – translation (11)
 Ches Smith – drums (3, 13), right channel (1)
 Tim Smolens – contrabass and engineering (7)
 Adam Stacey – accordion  and engineering (3, 11), piano (7)
 Kris Testanier – vocals (7)
 Hans Teuber – flute (7)
 William Winant – percussion (1, 2, 3, 4, 7, 8, 10, 11, 12), snare drum (7, 11), glockenspiel (3, 7), additional percussion (3), cabasa (3), temple blocks (3), tube bells (3), güiro (3), timpani (3), timpani (7), bass drum (7), vibraphone (7), viola (7), vocals (7)
 Moriah Neils – bassoon and contrabass (7)
 Melody Yenn – cello (2, 4, 6, 8, 11, 12)
 Zara Rivera – French horn (9)Production and design'
 Mike Bennewitz (as butcherBaker) – illustrations, design
 Thom Canova – engineering (1, 5)
 Randall Dunn – engineering (3, 7, 9, 11, 13) and synthesizer (13)
 Justin Phelps – engineering (1)
 Kurt Schlegel – engineering and mixing (1, 3, 7)
 Mark Thornton – illustrations, typesetting
 Marc Urselli – engineering and recording (13)

Release history

References

External links 
 Book of Souls: Folio A at iTunes
 Book of Souls: Folio A at Discogs (list of releases)

2013 albums
Secret Chiefs 3 albums
Web of Mimicry albums